Raymond Lamont Hoffman (June 14, 1917 – May 30, 2008) was a third baseman who played briefly for the Washington Senators during the  season. He was born in Detroit, Michigan. 
 
In his one-season career, Hoffman was a .053 hitter (1–for–19) with two runs and two RBI in seven games. He did not have any extra base hits.

Hoffman died in Milton, Georgia, at the age of 90.

See also
1942 Washington Senators season

External links
Baseball Almanac
Baseball Reference

Washington Senators (1901–1960) players
Major League Baseball third basemen
Baseball players from Michigan
1917 births
2008 deaths